Yisa Sofoluwe (28 December 1967, – 9 February 2021) was a Nigerian professional footballer who played as a defender. He won 40 caps and scored one goal for Nigerian, and was their regular left back between 1983 and 1988, playing at the 1984 and 1988 African Nations Cups.

Born in Abeokuta, Sofoluwe played for defunct Abiola Babes of Abeokuta, IICC of Ibadan and Gateway Football Club of Abeokuta.

He held sway in the right back position between 1983 and 1988, playing at the 1984 and 1988 Africa Cup of Nations in Côte d’Ivoire and Morocco respectively.

Yisa Sofoluwe died of COVID-19 at the Lagos University Teaching Hospital (LUTH) in Lagos on 9 February 2021, amid the COVID-19 pandemic in Nigeria. He was 53 years old.

References

1967 births
2021 deaths
Nigerian footballers
Deaths from the COVID-19 pandemic in Nigeria
Sportspeople from Abeokuta
Association football defenders
20th-century Nigerian people